"Josephine (Too Many Secrets)" is a song by Australian musician Jon English. The song was released in Scandinavia only in 1982. The track was the third single from his seventh studio album,  In Roads and peaked at number 9 in Norway in June 1982.

Track listing
 7" single (Frituna – FR-1114)
Side A 
 "Josephine (Too Many Secrets)" - 3:58
Side B
 "Straight From The Heart" - 2:58

 12" single (Frituna – FRDS-4)
Side A
 "Josephine (Too Many Secrets)" - 3:58
 "Move Better In The Night" - 4:49
Side B
 "Been In Love Before" - 4:10
 "You Might Need Somebody" - 3:35

Charts

References

Jon English songs
1981 songs
1982 singles
Mercury Records singles
Songs written by Tim Friese-Greene